Kani Kaleh (also Romanized as Kānī Kaleh; also known as Kānī Kīleh) is a village in Lahijan-e Sharqi Rural District, Lajan District, Piranshahr County, West Azerbaijan Province, Iran. At the 2006 census, its population was 114, in 16 families.

References 

Populated places in Piranshahr County